Tu Honggang (born March 15, 1967) is a Chinese singer and actor. He is best known for his singles The Patriots, Chinese Kung Fu, You, and Peacock Flying Southeast.

Apart from music, Tu commenced an acting career, appearing in Records of Kangxi's Travel Incognito (1997), Taizu Mishi (2015), Lady of the Dynasty (2015), and Let's Get Married (2015).

He is a member of the China Democratic League (Minmeng).

Early life and education
Tu was born in Beijing, China, on March 15, 1967. At the age of 11, he entered the National Academy of Chinese Theatre Arts, majoring in acting. In 1987, Pop music in Hong Kong and Taiwan was becoming widely popular in the Chinese mainland, Tu and his classmate often sung and studied songs with a recorder, he became a member of "Light Music", in his college years, he was a widely known campus singer.

Acting career
Tu had his first experience in front of the camera in 1991, and he was chosen to act as a support actor in Let Us Sway Twin Oars. He landed some small appearances in several TV series, such as Crazy Rolling Stones (1991), Temporary Families (1994), Sunny Beauty (2003), Memories of The Golden Flame (2008).

In 1997, he had a supporting role and sang the theme song in Records of Kangxi's Travel Incognito, a historical television series starring Zhang Guoli and Deng Jie.

In 2005, he appeared as Taksi in You Xiaogang's Taizu Mishi, which starred Steve Ma, Vivian Chen, Wu Qianqian, and Jin Qiaoqiao, and sang the theme song for the series.

In 2015, he participated in two films. He had a minor role as Chen Xuanli in Lady of the Dynasty, which starred Fan Bingbing, Leon Lai, Wu Chun and Joan Chen. He had a cameo appearance in Let's Get Married, a romantic comedy film starring Gao Yuanyuan, Jiang Wu, Li Chen, Zheng Kai, Ivy Chen, Bea Hayden, and Liu Tao.

Music career
In July 1985, Tu was assigned to China Railway Art Troupe as a solo. In November 1987, he was transferred to China Broadcasting Art Troupe. At the same year, he released his debut solo album Black Eyes.

His 2nd album, titled Lack for Nothing, was released on January 12, 1989.

In 1990, he sang a song in the CCTV New Year's Gala.

His 3rd album, titled Feeling, was released on November 7, 1991. Then he withdrew from the song circles.

From 1994 to 1996, he released his singles The Patriots, Chinese Kung Fu, You, and Peacock Flying Southeast.

On April 23, 2005, he released his 10th album Wind and Cloud 2.

In 2008, he performed on the MV of Welcome to Beijing for the 2008 Beijing Olympic Games.

On October 21, 2011, he went on a world tour in Beijing with a sold-out show. On November 20, 2012, his second station of the world tour was held in Taiyuan, Shanxi. On January 19, 2013, the world tour was held in Tiexi Gymnasium, Shenyang, Liaoning.

On New Year's Eve of Beijing Television in 2016, he performed his single Flying.

Personal life
Tu has married three times. In early 1989, he married his first wife Daisy, a 19-year-old American girl in the United States, and they had a son, Tu Ruibao. The couple divorced in 1992.

He married his second wife actress Fang Shu in October 1994. They had a child together, before they divorced June 5, 2002.

His third wife is Xiao Yue, and he has a stepson, Zhang Zixi.

Filmography

Film

TV series

Discography

Studio album

Singles

References

External links
 

1967 births
Living people
Singers from Beijing
Male actors from Beijing
Chinese male film actors
Chinese male television actors
National Academy of Chinese Theatre Arts alumni
Members of the China Democratic League
Middle School Affiliated to the National Academy of Chinese Theatre Arts alumni
Hui singers
Hui male actors